Commercial art may refer to:
 Commercial art
 Applied arts
 Visual communication
 Communication design